José Meseguer is a Spanish computer scientist, and professor at the University of Illinois at Urbana–Champaign. He leads the university's Formal Methods and Declarative Languages Laboratory.

Career
José Meseguer obtained his PhD in mathematics in 1975 with a thesis titled Primitive recursion in model categories under Michael Pfender at the University of Zaragoza, after which he did post-doctoral work at the University of Santiago de Compostela and the University of California at Berkeley. In 1980 he joined the Computer Science Laboratory at SRI International, eventually becoming a Principal Scientist and Head of the Logic and Declarative Languages Group. He joined the University of Illinois in 2001 and currently is Professor of Computer Science, where he leads their Formal Methods and Declarative Languages Laboratory.

He has worked particularly on the design and implementation of declarative languages, including OBJ and Maude, as well as rewriting logic.

He was awarded the 2019 Formal Methods Europe Fellowship. The award citation reads,

He was inducted as an ACM Fellow in 2020 "for the development of logical methods for design and verification of computational systems".

Selected research
Clavel, Manuel, et al. All about Maude — a high-performance logical framework: how to specify, program and verify systems in rewriting logic. Springer-Verlag, 2007.
Goguen, Joseph A., et al. "Introducing obj." Software Engineering with OBJ. Springer, Boston, MA, 2000. 3–167.
Meseguer, José. "Conditional rewriting logic as a unified model of concurrency." Theoretical computer science 96.1 (1992): 73–155.
Goguen, Joseph A., and José Meseguer. "Security policies and security models." 1982 IEEE Symposium on Security and Privacy. IEEE, 1982.

References

Living people
University of Illinois Urbana-Champaign faculty
Spanish computer scientists
University of Zaragoza alumni
SRI International people
1950 births